Nocera (born 1967), also known as Lulu Nocera, is a Sicilian-American club DJ and a trip hop, pop and freestyle singer. She is probably best known for her 1986 freestyle hits "Summertime Summertime" and "Let's Go".

Early years
Born in Sicily, Nocera was raised in Parma, Emilia-Romagna (in northern Italy), before emigrating to the United States when she was 18 years old.

Nocera signed with independent label Sleeping Bag Records in 1986, and released the single "Summertime Summertime" that same year. The single, produced by Floyd Fisher and remixed by Kurtis Mantronik, was included on Nocera's 1987 debut album, Over the Rainbow, and reached No. 2 on Billboard's Hot Dance/Club Play chart in 1986. The album also featured "Let's Go", a track remixed by Little Louie Vega, and written by Peitor Angell. It reached No. 8 on the Hot Dance/Club Play chart in 1987.

Following the release, tour, and promotion of Over the Rainbow, Nocera began work on a second album, but the album was not completed or released due to the closure of Sleeping Bag Records in 1991.

Voice of the Satellites and DJ career
Following the demise of Sleeping Bag Records, Nocera sang background vocals for freestyle acts Sa-Fire, India and Information Society in the early to mid-1990s. She also toured both nationally and internationally with Information Society, providing background vocals and keyboards.

In 2000, Nocera formed the trip hop group Voice of the Satellites with guitarist Gregg Fine and keyboardist John Roggie. The band's sound has been described as "a loose, trippy blend of hip hop, acid jazz, and points in-between and elsewhere." The band has released a couple of EPs, but has yet to be signed to a major label.

Nocera is also currently a club DJ based in New York City, and toured the United States with the 'Freestyle Explosion' concert series in 2006, where she favorably reprised her mid-1980s hits from Over the Rainbow.

Nocera currently fronts a band called the BB Batts.

References

External links
 [ AllMusic.com Biography – Nocera]
 Discogs.com Profile – Nocera
 lulunocera.com – Artist's website

Living people
Club DJs
American freestyle musicians
Musicians from Parma
Italian emigrants to the United States
Trip hop musicians
1967 births
American dance musicians
21st-century American women singers
21st-century American singers
Information Society (band) members
American women in electronic music
Sleeping Bag Records artists
21st-century American women musicians